The Great Mosque of Salé (Masjid Al Aadam) is a mosque in Salé, Morocco. It has been destroyed and rebuilt several times since the original construction. It was built in Almoravid and Almohad architectural styles, and the mosque features nine gates. It was severely damaged in the Bombardment of Salé of 1851, and was briefly closed during the French protectorate in Morocco.

History

The mosque has been destroyed and rebuilt many times since the beginning of the city's history. A first mosque was built under the orders of Temim Ibn Ziri from 1028 to 1029. A new, larger mosque was built in 1196 under Abu Yusuf Yaqub al-Mansur's orders after the old mosque's roof had collapsed. The architect of the Almohad building was known as al-Gharnati – a name which suggests he was from Granada in Al-Andalus. According to historian Abd Al-Mun'im Al-Hasidi, 700 French slaves were involved in the reconstruction under al-Mansur's orders.

In 1260 Salé was sacked and occupied by Castilian forces, during which 3000 women, children and elderly residents of the city were gathered in the mosque and taken as slaves for Seville. The Marinid sultan Abu Yusuf Yaqub reconquered the city soon afterwards. In 1342 another Marinid sultan, Abu al-Hasan, built the Madrasa of Abu al-Hasan next to the mosque, adding to its development as a religious and intellectual center of the city.

The mosque was largely rebuilt and modified over time, and its present appearance dates from the 18th century, when the city was part of the Republic of Bou Regreg. In 1851, Salé was bombarded by French forces, and the mosque was severely damaged after being struck by six cannonballs.

During the French protectorate in Morocco, the mosque was used for nationalist gatherings in the 1930s, led by people such as Said Hajji, Ahmed Maaninou, Boubker el-Kadiri, and Abu Bakr Zniber. The French protectorate later closed the mosque to prevent it being used as a place to awaken awareness of nationalist sentiment, but it later re-opened.

Gallery

See also
 Madrasa of Abu al-Hasan
List of mosques in Morocco

References

Religious buildings and structures completed in 1029
11th-century mosques
Mosques in Morocco
Almohad architecture
Buildings and structures in Salé